The Dark Eyes of London may refer to:

 The Dark Eyes of London (novel), a 1924 novel by Edgar Wallace
 The Dark Eyes of London (film), a 1939 British film

See also
 The Dead Eyes of London'', a 1961 German film known by this title